WBFC (1470 AM) is a Christian radio station licensed to Stanton, Kentucky, United States, playing a southern gospel format. The station is currently owned by Kentucky Mountain Bible College and features programming from Salem Media Group and Moody Radio.

References

External links

WBFC website

Powell County, Kentucky
Moody Radio affiliate stations
Southern Gospel radio stations in the United States
BFC
Radio stations established in 1975
1975 establishments in Kentucky